Kahutara is a rural locality and a statistical area in the South Wairarapa District and Wellington Region of New Zealand's North Island. The locality is east of Lake Wairarapa and west of Martinborough. The statistical area covers the area around Lake Wairarapa and extends southwest to Ocean Beach on Palliser Bay.

Demographics 

Kahutara had a population of 1,035 at the 2018 New Zealand census, an increase of 60 people (6.2%) since the 2013 census, and an increase of 102 people (10.9%) since the 2006 census. There were 396 households. There were 549 males and 486 females, giving a sex ratio of 1.13 males per female. The median age was 41.1 years (compared with 37.4 years nationally), with 213 people (20.6%) aged under 15 years, 180 (17.4%) aged 15 to 29, 522 (50.4%) aged 30 to 64, and 117 (11.3%) aged 65 or older.

Ethnicities were 91.6% European/Pākehā, 11.9% Māori, 1.7% Pacific peoples, 2.3% Asian, and 2.9% other ethnicities (totals add to more than 100% since people could identify with multiple ethnicities).

The proportion of people born overseas was 15.4%, compared with 27.1% nationally.

Although some people objected to giving their religion, 61.2% had no religion, 29.9% were Christian, 0.3% were Hindu, 0.3% were Buddhist and 2.3% had other religions.

Of those at least 15 years old, 153 (18.6%) people had a bachelor or higher degree, and 156 (19.0%) people had no formal qualifications. The median income was $41,000, compared with $31,800 nationally. The employment status of those at least 15 was that 477 (58.0%) people were employed full-time, 141 (17.2%) were part-time, and 18 (2.2%) were unemployed.

Education

References

South Wairarapa District
Populated places in the Wellington Region